Dynevor is an anglicised version of the Welsh placename Dinefwr

Dynevor Castle, officially Dinefwr Castle, a castle in Wales
Dynevor School, Swansea, a former secondary school in Wales
Dynevor, Queensland, a locality in south-west Queensland, Australia
Leo Dynevor (born 1974), Rugby league footballer
Sally Dynevor (born 1963), English soap opera actress
Phoebe Dynevor (born 1995), English actress
Baron Dynevor, officially Baron Dinevor, of Dinevor in the County of Carmarthen